Aymen Madi (born December 26, 1988) is an Algerian former footballer who played in the Algerian Ligue Professionnelle 1.

Club career
Born in Kouba, Madi began his playing career with local side RC Kouba. In the summer of 2011, Madi was linked with a number of clubs including JS Kabylie, USM Alger and JSM Béjaïa. However, on July 13, 2011, Madi signed a two-year contract with newly promoted NA Hussein Dey. On September 10, 2011, Madi his official debut for the club as a starter in a league match against ES Sétif. Madi played sparingly during his first season with NA Hussein Dey under manager Chaâbane Merzekane, and asked to be released from his contract in April 2012.

References

External links
 DZFoot Profile
 

1988 births
Living people
Algerian footballers
Algerian Ligue Professionnelle 1 players
Algerian Ligue 2 players
NA Hussein Dey players
JS Kabylie players
RC Kouba players
Association football midfielders
21st-century Algerian people